Laurens Christiaan Looije (born January 12, 1973 in The Hague, South Holland) is a Dutch pole vaulter, who represented his native country at the 1996 Summer Olympics in Atlanta, United States.

Looije finished 8th in the pole vault final at the 2006 European Athletics Championships in Gothenburg. He was also the 1992 World Junior champion, and won a bronze medal at the 2001 Summer Universiade.

His personal best is 5.71 metres, achieved in August 1998 in Hechtel. He is a five times outdoor and nine times indoor Dutch national champion.

Achievements

External links

1973 births
Living people
Dutch male pole vaulters
Olympic athletes of the Netherlands
Athletes (track and field) at the 1996 Summer Olympics
Sportspeople from The Hague
Universiade medalists in athletics (track and field)
Universiade bronze medalists for the Netherlands
Medalists at the 2001 Summer Universiade